Michael Gibbons (November 15, 1866 – February 27, 1933) was an oiler serving in the United States Navy during the Spanish–American War who received the Medal of Honor for bravery.

Biography
Gibbons was born on November 15, 1866, in Ireland and after immigrating to the United States he entered the navy. He was sent to fight in the Spanish–American War aboard the U.S.S. Nashville as an oiler. After being discharged from the navy he lived for a while in Portsmouth, Virginia and after living in the US for 35 years he returned to Ireland.

He died at his home in Ireland in 1933, and until 1999 was buried in an unmarked grave in Old Kilmeena Cemetery.

Medal of Honor citation
Rank and organization: Oiler, U.S. Navy. Born: Ireland. Accredited to: New York. G.O. No.: 521, 7 July 1899.

Citation:

On board the U.S.S. Nashville during the operation of cutting the cable leading from Cienfugos, Cuba, 11 May 1898. Facing the heavy fire of the enemy, Gibbons set an example of extraordinary bravery and coolness throughout this action.

See also

 List of Medal of Honor recipients for the Spanish–American War

References

External links
 
 

1866 births
1933 deaths
19th-century Irish people
United States Navy Medal of Honor recipients
United States Navy sailors
American military personnel of the Spanish–American War
Irish-born Medal of Honor recipients
Irish emigrants to the United States (before 1923)
Irish sailors in the United States Navy
Spanish–American War recipients of the Medal of Honor
Military personnel from County Mayo